Gustaf A. L. Svensson (17 March 1882 – 13 July 1950) was a Swedish sailor who competed in the 1920 Summer Olympics. Svensson won an Olympic silver medal in sailing during the 1920 Summer Olympics in Antwerp . He was a crew member of the Swedish boat Elsie, which won the silver medal in the 40 m² class.

References

External links
profile

1882 births
1950 deaths
Swedish male sailors (sport)
Sailors at the 1920 Summer Olympics – 40m2 Skerry cruiser
Olympic sailors of Sweden
Olympic silver medalists for Sweden
Olympic medalists in sailing
Medalists at the 1920 Summer Olympics